Kwak Jung-hoon (born 24 June 1958) is a South Korean sport shooter who competed in the 1984 Summer Olympics and in the 1988 Summer Olympics.

References

1958 births
Living people
South Korean male sport shooters
ISSF rifle shooters
Olympic shooters of South Korea
Shooters at the 1984 Summer Olympics
Shooters at the 1988 Summer Olympics
Shooters at the 1982 Asian Games
Shooters at the 1986 Asian Games
Asian Games medalists in shooting
Asian Games gold medalists for South Korea
Asian Games bronze medalists for South Korea
Medalists at the 1982 Asian Games
Medalists at the 1986 Asian Games
20th-century South Korean people
21st-century South Korean people